Michael Anthony Esposito (born September 27, 1981) is a former Major League Baseball starting pitcher who played for the Colorado Rockies. He throws right and bats right.

Esposito's only Major League experience came during the  season, where he served as a starting pitcher for 3 games as a late-season call-up when rosters expanded.

Mike Esposito is the son of Joe "Bean" Esposito, best known for singing "You're the Best" and as the lead singer for the Brooklyn Dreams whose duet "Heaven Knows" with Donna Summer reached #4 on Billboards Hot 100.

References

External links

1981 births
Living people
Major League Baseball pitchers
Colorado Rockies players
Colorado Springs Sky Sox players
Baseball players from California
Yuma Scorpions players
Tulsa Drillers players
Visalia Oaks players
Arizona State Sun Devils baseball players